Go to the Head of the Class is a roll-and-move board game published originally by the company Milton Bradley (now owned by Hasbro). It was last produced by Winning Moves USA in 2013. The game was first released around 1940 and remains in print.

The game board is designed to look like a top view of a school classroom with the teacher's blackboard at one end. Original tokens were cardboard images of adult and children affixed to wooden or plastic bases.  Players can advance to the "head of the class" by moving tokens from desk to desk as a result of answering questions correctly. The game also includes random "chance cards" that add or subtract positions without involving a question, such as "Put away that peashooter and go back 3 desks" or "For good penmanship, advance two desks".

References

Board games introduced in 1936
Children's board games
Milton Bradley Company games
Race games
Roll-and-move board games
Tabletop games